Wittenbergen is a municipality in the district of Steinburg, in Schleswig-Holstein, Germany.

It is a part of collective municipality Breitenburg (Amt)

References

Steinburg